Lost Bridge Village is a census-designated place in Benton County, Arkansas, United States. Per the 2020 census, the population was 397. It is located in the Northwest Arkansas region.

Demographics

2020 census

Note: the US Census treats Hispanic/Latino as an ethnic category. This table excludes Latinos from the racial categories and assigns them to a separate category. Hispanics/Latinos can be of any race.

Education 
Public education for early childhood, elementary and secondary school students is provided by the Rogers School District.

References

Census-designated places in Benton County, Arkansas
Census-designated places in Arkansas